L'homme qui me ressemble (The Man Who Resembles Me) is the first full-length album by Franco-Ontarian musician Damien Robitaille.

Track listing
 Mètres de mon être
 Je tombe
 Cercles
 Rouge-gorge
 Voyeur planétaire
 L'homme qui me ressemble
 Tous les sujets sont tabous
 Mon atlas
 Astronaute
 Amnésie sélective
 Porc-épic
 Électrique
 Sexy séparatiste
 Dans l'horizon je vois l'aube

References

2006 debut albums
Damien Robitaille albums
Audiogram (label) albums